The Wombat 100 is an endurance mountain biking event held each year since 2008 in Wombat State Forest, in western central Victoria, Australia. The main race is set on a 100 kilometre course with minimal repetition. The exact route changes each year, but usually features roughly equal parts of singletrack and firetrail or dirt road, with no asphalt. Categories include men, women, elite, veterans, juniors (on a much shorter course) and cyclocross.

Winners

References

Cycling in Victoria (Australia)